Victoria Civera Redondo (born 1955) is a Spanish artist. She combines photography, painting, installation and sculpture in her contemporary works. She lives between New York City and Saro in Cantabria, Spain. Her work has been shown internationally, including in the United States, Belgium, France and Brazil.

Biography 
Civera studied at the Real Academia de Bellas Artes de San Carlos de Valencia, between 1973 to 1977. She is married to artist Juan Uslé, whom she has occasionally worked together with. Together they have a daughter, Vicky Uslé (born 1981) who is also a painter.

Civera's first solo exhibition was held at the Museo de Bellas Artes de Santander (now Museo de Arte Moderno y Contemporáneo de Santander y Cantabria) in 1980. Since 1987, she lives with her family between New York City and Saro, Cantabria.

Her artwork find personal meaning in the use and imagery of inanimate objects and repeating shapes. Some of her work explores space and volume; and will experiment with form both on and off canvas. In 2017, Civera was awarded the Tomás Francisco Prieto Prize.

References 

1955 births
Living people
People from Valencia
20th-century Spanish painters
21st-century Spanish painters
20th-century Spanish women artists
21st-century Spanish women artists